The 1980–81 2. Bundesliga season was the seventh season of the 2. Bundesliga, the second tier of the German football league system. It was played in two regional divisions, Nord and Süd. This was the final season of the original two region 2. Bundesliga, as the DFB sought to integrate the Nord and Süd divisions into a single division for the next campaign. This meant 22 teams faced the drop to the Oberliga (12 from the Nord, 10 from the Süd). There were three promotion spots to the Bundesliga on offer, while the remaining teams would enter the new single league 2. Bundesliga in the next season.

Werder Bremen, Eintracht Braunschweig and SV Darmstadt 98 were promoted to the Bundesliga while twenty two clubs were relegated to the Oberligas.

Nord 
The 1980–81 season saw 1. FC Bocholt, Göttingen 05, SpVgg Erkenschwick and VfB Oldenburg promoted to the 2. Bundesliga from the Oberligas while Hertha BSC, Werder Bremen and Eintracht Braunschweig had been relegated to the 2. Bundesliga Nord from the Bundesliga.

League table

Results

Top scorers

Süd
The 1980–81 season saw Borussia Neunkirchen, FC Augsburg, Hessen Kassel and VfB Eppingen promoted to the 2. Bundesliga from the Oberligas while no club had been relegated to the 2. Bundesliga Süd from the Bundesliga.

League table

Results

Top scorers 
The league's top scorers:

Promotion play-offs
The final place in the Bundesliga was contested between the two runners-up in the Nord and Süd divisions. Eintracht Braunschweig won on aggregate and were promoted to the Bundesliga.

Qualification for single-division 2. Bundesliga
There was a sophisticated system for qualifying for the new single-division 2. Bundesliga. First, the clubs had to meet technical qualification criteria. These stipulated that the stadiums had to accommodate at least 15,000 spectators and had to be equipped with floodlights within a certain period of time. If these requirements were met, sporting criteria would come into play. The non-promoted teams in fourth place and above from the Nord and Süd divisions, along with the three relegated teams from the 1980–81 Bundesliga, automatically qualified. The other participants (teams from 5th to 16th place in the Nord and Süd) were determined by a so-called "placement number". This was calculated from the positions achieved by teams in the last three seasons. The lower this number was, the better the club was placed. For the 1978–79 season, the table position was multiplied by one, the 1979–80 season by two and the current 1980–81 season by three. Seasons in the Bundesliga were tallied as zero. For Oberliga seasons in which teams did not achieve promotion, 20 points were added, and 16 points for seasons which teams were promoted. It was also important from which region the three relegated teams of the Bundesliga were from, as well as how many teams were promoted from the respective Nord and Süd divisions. At the end, 10 teams from the Nord and Süd divisions had represented in the next season. Teams in 17th and below from the Nord and Süd were relegated, irrespective of their placement number. There was no promotion for teams from the Oberliga going into the single-division season.

References

General references

External links
 2. Bundesliga 1980/1981 Nord at Weltfussball.de 
 2. Bundesliga 1980/1981 Süd at Weltfussball.de 
 1980–81 2. Bundesliga at kicker.de 

1980-81
2
Ger